Gries may refer to:

Places
Gries am Brenner, a municipality in Tyrol, Austria
Gries, Bas-Rhin, a municipality in the department Bas-Rhin, France
Gries im Sellrain, a municipality in Tyrol, Austria
Gries, Germany, a municipality in Rhineland-Palatinate, Germany
Gries (Graz), the 5th city district of Graz, Austria
 (German: Gries-Quirein), a borough of Bozen-Bolzano, Italy
, Bolzano
Old Parish Church of Gries, Bolzano
Gries Glacier (Griesgletscher), a 5 km long glacier (2005) situated in the Lepontine Alps in the canton of Valais in Switzerland
Gries Pass, a mountain pass in the Alps, between Switzerland and Italy

Corno Gries, a mountain in the Lepontine Alps on the Swiss -Italian border

Surname
David Gries (born 1939), computer scientist at Cornell University
Gerhard Gries (born 1955), German ecologist
Jon Gries (born 1957), American actor, writer and director
Moses J. Gries (1866–1918), American rabbi
Peter Gries, Harold J. & Ruth Newman Chair in US-China Issues and Director of the Institute for U.S.-China Issues
Theo Gries (born 1961), German football coach and a retired player
Tom Gries (1921–1977), American TV and film director, writer and producer
Roger William Gries (born 1937), American Catholic bishop
Stefan Th. Gries (born 1970), (Full) Professor of Linguistics at the University of California, Santa Barbara

See also
 Grice (disambiguation)
 Griese (disambiguation)
 Robert Griess (born 1945), American mathematician